Yordanys Durañona García (born 16 June 1988) is a Cuban-born triple jumper, who competed internationally for Dominica. Switching allegiance from his native Cuba in 2011, he represented Dominica in a multitude of international tournaments, including the 2014 Commonwealth Games, 2015 Pan American Games, and 2016 Summer Olympics. Durañona also achieved his outdoor best jump of 17.20 m (-1.0 m/s) at the 2014 Pan American Sports Festival in Mexico City.

Durañona competed for Dominica in the men's triple jump at the 2016 Summer Olympics in Rio de Janeiro. Leading up to his maiden Games, he successfully eclipsed the IAAF Olympic standard (16.85) with a best jump of 16.98 m for a gold-medal triumph at the 2015 NACAC Championships in San José, Costa Rica. Durañona crashed out of the qualifying phase without attaining a mark against his name, failing to produce a single legal jump in all three attempts. Durañona also served as the country's flag bearer at the parade of nations segment of the opening ceremony.

Competition record

References

External links
 

1988 births
Living people
Athletes from Havana
Dominica triple jumpers
Cuban male triple jumpers
Dominica male athletes
World Athletics Championships athletes for Dominica
Athletes (track and field) at the 2014 Commonwealth Games
Athletes (track and field) at the 2015 Pan American Games
Athletes (track and field) at the 2016 Summer Olympics
Athletes (track and field) at the 2018 Commonwealth Games
Olympic athletes of Dominica
Pan American Games competitors for Dominica
Commonwealth Games medallists in athletics
Commonwealth Games silver medallists for Dominica
Olympic male triple jumpers
Central American and Caribbean Games medalists in athletics
Competitors at the 2014 Central American and Caribbean Games
Central American and Caribbean Games bronze medalists for Cuba
Medallists at the 2018 Commonwealth Games